Haptoclinus dropi, the Four-fin blenny, is a species of labrisomid blenny only known to occur off of Curaçao in the Caribbean where it was collected from a deep-sea reef at a depth between .  The only specimen collected, a female, measured  SL.

Etymology
The species is named after the Smithsonian Institution's Deep Reef Observation Project (DROP), under which program this species was discovered.  The proposed common name, "Four-fin blenny", is based on the species' dorsal fin configuration.

References

dropi
Fish described in 2013